Andrew Stotz, CFA is a former president of the CFA Society Thailand and is one of Thailand's award-winning equity analysts. He is also the founder and CEO of A. Stotz Investment Research (ASIR), a financial services company based in Bangkok, Thailand. Prior to launching ASIR he had spent 20 years working global investment banks in Asia. He has also been a university lecturer in finance for more than two decades and is a co-founder of CoffeeWORKS Co. Ltd., Thailand's specialty coffee roaster.

Education 
He graduated with a Bachelor of Science degree in finance and an MBA from California State University. He earned his Ph.D. in finance at the University of Science and Technology of China, in Hefei, Anhui province.

Career 
Andrew Stotz is the founder and current CEO of A. Stotz Investment Research (ASIR), providing institutional investors and fund managers with financial services such as valuation, stock selection, and portfolio creation in Asian markets, based on the proprietary FVMR methodology. The methodology is aimed to not only favor one style such as value or growth, but instead considers four elements Fundamentals, Valuation, Momentum, and Risk—FVMR. In addition, Stotz is a former president of the CFA Society of Thailand, a public speaker on topics such as investing, valuation, and management related to Dr. Deming's teachings. Since 2016, Stotz and ASIR have made much of their research free and publicly available through their initiative Become a Better Investor. In 2017, Stotz started the Valuation Master Class with an aim to help young people build great careers in finance. In 2019, more than 1,000 students from more than 30 countries had entered the Valuation Master Class.

In 2013, Andrew Stotz retired from a 20-year career as an equity analyst at various investment banks in Thailand to set up ASIR. His last position was as a portfolio strategist and managing director of the International Business Department at Maybank Kim Eng Securities (Thailand).

He is a recognized public speaker and commentator on matters of investing in Thailand and Asia in general, invited and quoted by Bloomberg, US News, The Star and other regional and global news outlets.

Books 
 How to Start Building Your Wealth Investing in the Stock Market
 Transform Your Business with Dr. Deming's 14 Points
 9 Valuation Mistakes and How to Avoid Them
 My Worst Investment Ever

SSRN publications 
 Ten Stocks are Enough in Asia
 Eight Stocks are Enough in China
 Financial Analysts Were Only Wrong by 25%
 An Empirical Study of Financial Analysts Earnings Forecast Accuracy

Private life & family 
Andrew Stotz is the grandson of architect, architectural historian, and preservationist Charles Morse Stotz, and the great grandson of a notable Pittsburgh architect Edward Stotz.

References

Year of birth missing (living people)
Living people
American chief executives
California State University, Long Beach alumni
American expatriates in Thailand
Place of birth missing (living people)
University of Science and Technology of China alumni
CFA charterholders